Kevin Andrew Maddick (born 18 September 1974) is an English former footballer who played as a forward in the Football League for Darlington. He began his football career as a youngster with Middlesbrough, and went on to play non-league football for Seaham Red Star.

References

1974 births
Living people
Footballers from Newcastle upon Tyne
English footballers
Association football forwards
Middlesbrough F.C. players
Darlington F.C. players
Seaham Red Star F.C. players
English Football League players